Diplublephara is a monotypic moth genus in the family Geometridae. Its only species, Diplublephara cornujuxta, is found in Sulawesi, Indonesia. Both the genus and the species were described by Sato in 1995.

References

Boarmiini